Article 16 can refer to:

 Article 16 of the Northern Ireland Protocol
 Article 16 of the European Convention on Human Rights
 Article 16 of the Constitution of the Hellenic Republic